Dialing for Dollars was a franchised format local television program in the United States and Canada, popular from the 1950s to the early 1990s.

Format

The program's usual format had the host, a local television personality, announce a certain password to the audience at the beginning of the program (on most stations, "the count and the amount"). He would then randomly select a phone number to call from a bowl or drum, either from those that had been previously submitted by viewers, or by scraps of paper cut from residential telephone directories. Viewers watching the show would know that they were being called, answer the phone with the correct password, and would win a monetary prize. If the viewer did not respond correctly or failed to answer the call altogether, the prize money would continue to increase until it was claimed.  

"The count" consisted of a number (1 through 9) and direction (up/down or top/bottom), randomly selected at the beginning of the show, that served to determine which number would be called. Slips were cut from pages of the viewing area's telephone book(s), each containing several numbers; at each playing, one slip was drawn and the appropriate number was selected. If the count was "6 Down," for example, the sixth number down from the top of the slip was called. "The amount" was the value of the cash prize at stake.

Dialing for Dollars originated as a radio program in 1939 on WCBM in Baltimore, Maryland, hosted by Homer Todd. With the advent and rise of commercial television broadcasting in the U.S. during the late 1940s and 1950s, the format switched to television and was franchised nationally as a popular, low-budget way to fill local market airtime, especially in the late mornings. 

On some stations (such as KTVU hosted by Pat McCormick, who also did voices for the Charley & Humphry puppets during a local cartoon show), the Dialing for Dollars format would be used during the local telecasting of a morning or afternoon movie. The film would be interrupted by a dialing for dollars segment every so often, rather than going to a commercial break, after which the program either went to a commercial or directly back to the film. On others, such as WKBW's version and WTNH's version, both versions are variety shows complete with studio audience and mini-games, The difference between both stations is that WTNH's version also contains special guests and performances after dialing games or mini-games. However, WKBW's version runs for an entire hour, and WTNH's version runs for 30 minutes as normal. 

By the mid-1970s, the popularity faded for the Dialing for Dollars format, as competition developed from daytime talk shows, and more sophisticated game shows coming from syndication. Another factor in the show's decline was the trend of fewer households having stay-at-home members available to answer the phone during the day. Dialing for Dollars left the Baltimore airwaves in 1977 (although it is still seen in a few markets), after giving away $800,000 locally in its 38-year run there on radio and television.

Broadway producer Lee Guber attempted to resurrect the concept on a national basis in 1987, meeting with Canadian broadcaster Peter Emmerson with regards to hosting what would have emanated from the former GFG Productions facilities in Brooklyn.  The project was never completed due to Guber's illness which was diagnosed soon after; he died of a brain tumor on March 27, 1988.

The program has also been satirized on the Canadian sketch comedy series SCTV.

Live with Kelly and Ryan carries on the tradition with its daily Travel Trivia contest, and a few local shows directly trace their lineage to Dialing for Dollars (an example is AM Buffalo).

The program was also referenced in Janis Joplin's classic hit song "Mercedes Benz" from the 1970 album "Pearl".

More recently, cable network Adult Swim has periodically revived the concept beginning in mid-2018 for their online livestream; due to the original concept being rendered obsolete by the advancement of technology, instead viewers of the livestream must memorize a certain word (indicated by the onscreen appearance of a plane marked "SPY"). Viewers that enter their phone number into the Adult Swim website can then have a chance to be picked to win a prize of some sort if they are picked during the drawing (which is broadcast Thursdays at 9PM on the livestream) and say the correct word.

List of stations that carried Dialing for Dollars

CICT-TV (formerly CFAC) – Calgary, Alberta, Canada
KARK-TV – Little Rock, Arkansas (originally used for newscasts since 2018)
KATC-TV – Lafayette, Louisiana
KBJR-TV (formerly WDSM) – Superior, Wisconsin/Duluth, Minnesota
KPAC-TV – Port Arthur, Texas
KCOP – Los Angeles, California, Johnny Gilbert hosted the show
KCPQ – Seattle, Washington
KCRG-TV – Cedar Rapids, Iowa
KFIZ-TV – Fond du Lac, Wisconsin
KJEO-TV – Fresno, California
KMBC-TV – Kansas City, Missouri
KODE-TV – Joplin, Missouri
KOAT-TV – Albuquerque, New Mexico
KOBI – Medford, Oregon, used a different format version of Dialing for Dollars titled "Jackpot Bingo" which had different formats and developments until canceled in 1988.
KPHO – Phoenix, Arizona
KPTV – Portland, Oregon
KQTV – St. Joseph, Missouri (late 1970s)
KRQE – Albuquerque, New Mexico (early 1970s)
KSL-TV – Salt Lake City, Utah
KTBS-TV – Shreveport, Louisiana, first known as "Dialing Dollars Theatre".
KTHV – Little Rock, Arkansas, under a different title, to compete with KARK
KTNT – Seattle, Washington, hosted by Al Cummings (nicknamed "Mr. Fortune")
KTRK-TV – Houston, Texas (1968-1977)
KTVX – Salt Lake City, Utah, hosted by disc-jockey Lynn Lehmann. KCPX/KTVX's version aired during The Mike Douglas Show in the early 1970s until 1972, and was later aired during Truth or Consequences.
KIII-TV – Corpus Christi, Texas
KSTP-TV - Minneapolis/St. Paul, Minnesota
KHON - Honolulu, Hawaii
KTAL-TV – Shreveport, Louisiana, “Dialing for Thousands”.
KTSM-TV – El Paso, Texas, hosted by weatherman and former El Paso city councilman Ted Bender.
KTVI-TV – Saint Louis, Missouri, hosted by Morgan Hatch.
KTVU – Oakland, California, Mel Venter and later Bob March in the morning and Pat McCormick in the afternoon hosted the show. Bob Eldred hosted an evening version called "The Jackpot Movie."
KUSA – Denver, Colorado, also as KBTV, Stormy Rottman hosted the segments.
KVLY-TV (then KTHI-TV) – Fargo/Grand Forks, North Dakota
KXLY-TV – Spokane, Washington
KXMB-TV – Bismarck, North Dakota, hosted by Rodger Dixens and Karen MacKinson (1972 until 1977)
KXMC-TV – Minot, North Dakota hosted by Davey Bee and a lady simply known as Euenvo (during the 1970s)
KDIX-TV –Dickinson, North Dakota, hosted by Stan Deck and Lorren Haake
WAAY-TV – Huntsville, Alabama
WALA-TV – Mobile, Alabama, hosted by Danny Treanor, ran for a short time from 1968 until 1970.
WAWV-TV (then WIIL-TV) – Terre Haute, Indiana, hosted by Woody Berlin
WANE-TV – Fort Wayne, Indiana, hosted by Dave King
WAVY-TV – Norfolk, Virginia
WBBH-TV – Fort Myers, Florida, aired for a short time until WEVU took it over.
WBRC-TV – Birmingham, Alabama
WCIA-TV – Champaign, Illinois
WCWB-TV – Macon, Georgia, first hosted by Barbara Cheshire, later taken over by an unknown woman with her last name being Colson for a short period of time, and ran during "Fortune Feature" movies from 1971 until 1974.
WJKS-TV – Jacksonville, Florida
WCIX – Miami, Florida, Patricia San Pedro hosted the show.
WDBB-TV – Tuscaloosa, Alabama, originally called "Dialing for Big Bucks", hosted by Brent Jones.
WDSU-TV – New Orleans, Louisiana
WEVU-TV – Fort Myers, Florida
WFAA-TV – Dallas, Texas, hosts included Ed Hogan, Ross Cass, and "Dandy" Don Norman
WFLD-TV - Chicago, Illinois (late 60s, early 70s) hosted by Jerry G. Bishop
WFMJ-TV – Youngstown, Ohio
WFRV-TV – Green Bay, Wisconsin
WFTV – Orlando, Florida, hosted by Russ Wheeler beginning in 1970, later by Pete Forgione until January 1984, and later by Merita Valentine until October 1984. An unknown host hosted the last 3 months of the program, which was canceled on January 4, 1985.
WGHP-TV – High Point, North Carolina (late 1970s, early 1980s), hosted by Dick Bennick, later Jo Nelson.
WHBQ-TV – Memphis, Tennessee (January 6, 1969 - September 1, 1978), WHBQ news anchor Dave Brown was the original program host and continued various times during its run. Later hosts included local talk show hostess Marge Thrasher. 
WHO-TV – Des Moines, Iowa
WISN-TV – Milwaukee, Wisconsin. Dialing for Dollars began at the station in December 1967.  A news/talk/contest show, the program is noted for its long-standing husband-and-wife hosting team of Howard and Rosemary Gernette.  The Dialing contest remained when the show was rechristened At Twelve in 1980.
WJZ-TV – Baltimore, Maryland,  used "The Hustle" as the theme music, and at one point in the 1970s, Oprah Winfrey hosted the show.
WKBD-TV – Detroit, Michigan, aired during the final quarter of the 1960s.
WKBW-TV – Buffalo, New York, practically, this show was never canceled. Its name was changed when Dave Thomas/Dave Roberts left the station for WPVI in 1978, and the show was renamed without the Dialing for Dollars franchise to AM Buffalo, which still airs today.
WLBZ – Bangor, Maine
WLKY – Louisville, Kentucky
WLNE-TV – New Bedford, Massachusetts, George Allen hosted the show
WMAR-TV – Baltimore, Maryland (1948 - 1977), hosted by Stu Kerr and later in the 1970s by George Rogers.
WNAC-TV – Boston, Massachusetts Ed Miller hosted the show.
WNEP-TV – Scranton, Pennsylvania 
WNEW-TV – New York City (mid-1960s)
WPLG-TV – Miami, Florida Jay L. Mann Hosted, only lasted in the early 1970s until WCIX-TV took over the show in the mid-1970s.
WPTV-TV – West Palm Beach, Florida, Dave Davis hosted the show
WPRI-TV – Providence, Rhode Island (late 1960s, early 1970s) hosted by Salty Brine
WPVI-TV – Philadelphia, first hosted by Bob McLean in 1973, who would later host a talk show in Canada on CBC Television; it was also presented by Jim O'Brien
WRAL-TV – Raleigh, North Carolina, presented by Bob DeBardelaben, later forecaster of the station.
WXEX-TV (now WRIC-TV) – Richmond, Virginia (one-hour show ran from about 1959 until 1970)
WROC-TV – Rochester, New York, hosted by Ann Keefe
WREX-TV – Rockford, Illinois
WSTM-TV (formerly WSYR-TV) – Syracuse, New York, hosted by Ed Murphy
WSUN-TV – St. Petersburg, Florida, WSUN's version only lasted in the mid-1960s until 1967 when WTSP took the show over again for the first time since its last run in 1959, and ran until 1970.
WTCN-TV – Minneapolis/St. Paul, Minnesota; Mel Jass hosted Dialing for Dollars as a segment incorporated into his Mel's Matinee Movie program in the early 1970s.
WTAE-TV – Pittsburgh, Pennsylvania (1965 - 1972)
WTEN-TV – Albany, New York, co-hosted by Ralph Vartigian and John Stewart from 1970-1975.
WTNH-TV – New Haven, Connecticut, 30 minute local television game/variety show.
WLCY-TV / WTSP – St. Petersburg, Florida, the 45-minute version of the show only ran from 1957-1959, and Tampa never had a Dialing for Dollars program until 1965 when WSUN-TV took it over. And in 1967, WTSP took over the show and ran until 1970 and WTOG Channel 44 ran the series.
WTOG – St Petersburg, Florida, later renamed as "Tele-Quest" in 1988.
WTVC-TV – Chattanooga, Tennessee
WTVF-TV (previously WLAC-TV) – Nashville, Tennessee
WXIA-TV – Atlanta, Georgia, Linda Faye Carson and Don Barber, then Freddie Miller hosted the show
KELO-TV – Sioux Falls, South Dakota, during the noon news block
WTOL-TV – Toledo, Ohio, during The Big Show (weekday afternoon movie), hosted by weatherman Joe Ashton

Other local formats
A similar format, The Money Man, was used on WLOS-TV Asheville, North Carolina, in the late 1960s.  Host Bob Caldwell would call viewers and ask them to tell how much money was in the jackpot and name the show or star of the day.  This aired in late afternoons, during reruns of Perry Mason and the station's 5:30 PM newscast.

Another similar format, the Prize Movie, aired for many years on WUAB-TV in Cleveland, Ohio; host John Lanigan would call people in a manner similar to Dialing for Dollars, and would spin a wheel containing photos of both station personalities and stars of the syndicated fare seen on the station; he would then ask the caller to identify that person. If they did so successfully, they won the jackpot (which always ended in 43 cents). This lasted for many years, until the station opted to replace the Prize Movie with a slate of syndicated talk shows in the fall of 1993; this was a failure and the Prize Movie was brought back in January of 1994, and ended for good that August.

WFLI-TV in Chattanooga, Tennessee, beginning with its first year of operation in 1987, ran a 30-minute live and locally-produced program entitled 53 Trivia Spin. The program was equivalent to the Dialing for Dollars format, hosted by Bob Broome and Cynthia Davis. Bob would give the viewers a question, then a person would call in to answer the question. Once the caller gets a correct answer, the caller then chooses a number between 1 and 18 (including two "53" spaces) that were listed on the wheel before Cynthia would spin it. Once a random non-selected number was landed, the caller would win a selected amount of money or a smaller prize that was given such as coupons and tickets. If a selected number was landed, a big prize would be given to the caller such as vehicles and trips, which its prize was changed each round.

See also
Bowling for Dollars
TV Powww

References

External links
 Ad for Dialing for Dollars in Des Moines, Iowa
 Broadcast Pioneers of Philadelphia: Dialing for Dollars on WPVI

Local game shows in the United States
Local television programming in the United States
Local motion picture television series
Franchised television formats